Awadhi, also known as Audhi, is an Indo-Aryan language spoken in northern India and Nepal.  It is primarily spoken in the Awadh region of present-day Uttar Pradesh, India. The name Awadh is connected to Ayodhya, the ancient city, which is regarded as the homeland of the Hindu god Rama. See also, the Oudh state which was settled in North India during the Mughal rule. It was, along with Braj Bhasha, used widely as a literary vehicle before being displaced by Hindustani in the 19th century.

Linguistically, Awadhi is a language at par with Hindustani. However, it is regarded by the state to be a dialect of the Central Indo-Aryan (Hindi) languages, and the area where Awadhi is spoken to be a part of the Hindi-language area owing to their cultural proximity. As a result, Modern Standard Hindi, rather than Awadhi, is used for school instructions as well as administrative and official purposes; and its literature falls within the scope of Hindi literature.

Alternative names of Awadhi include Baiswāri (after the subregion of Baiswara), as well as the sometimes ambiguous Pūrbī, literally meaning "eastern", and Kōsalī (named after the ancient Kosala Kingdom).

Geographic distribution

In India 
Awadhi is predominantly spoken in the Awadh region encompassing central Uttar Pradesh, along with the lower part of the Ganga-Yamuna doab. In the west, it is bounded by Western Hindi, specifically Kannauji and Bundeli, while in the east, Bhojpuri from the Bihari group of Eastern Indo-Aryan languages is spoken.  In the north, it is bounded by the country of Nepal and in the south by Bagheli, which shares a great resemblance with Awadhi.

The following districts of North and Central UP speak Awadhi-
 Lakhimpur Kheri
 Sitapur
 Hardoi
 Unnao
 Fatehpur
 Barabanki
 Lucknow
 Rae Bareli
 Amethi
 Baharich.

In eastern parts of UP the Awadhi language changes it's form to a special dialect called "Eastern Standard Awadhi." This region makes boundary with bhojpuri speaking districts of Purvanchal. This part include districts of-
 Ayodhya
 Ambedkar Nagar
 Prayagraj
 Jaunpur
 Mirzapur
 Bhadohi
 Sultanpur
 Pratapgarh
 Gonda
 Basti
 Siddharthnagar
 Kaushambi
 Sant Kabir Nagar

In Nepal 
Awadhi is spoken in two provinces in Nepal:
 Lumbini Province
 Banke District
 Bardiya District
 Dang District
 Kapilvastu District
 Parasi District
 Rupandehi District
 Sudurpashchim Province
 Kailali District
 Kanchanpur District

Outside South Asia 

A language influenced by Awadhi (as well as other languages) is also spoken as a lingua franca for Indians in Fiji and is referred to as Fijian Hindi. According to Ethnologue, it is a type of Awadhi influenced by Bhojpuri and is also classified as Eastern-Hindi. Another language influenced by Awadhi (and Bhojpuri) is Caribbean Hindustani, spoken by Indians in the Caribbean countries of Trinidad and Tobago, Suriname, and Guyana. The Hindustani that is spoken in South Africa and the Bhojpuri spoken in Mauritius is also partly influenced by Awadhi. These forms of Awadhi are also spoken by the diaspora in North America, Europe, and Oceania.

Classification 

Awadhi is an Indo-European language and belongs to the Indo-Aryan sub-group of the Indo-Iranian language family. Within the Indo-Aryan dialect continuum, it falls under the East-Central zone of languages and is often recognised as Eastern-Hindi. It's generally believed that an older form of Ardhamagadhi, which agreed partly with Sauraseni and partly with Magadhi Prakrit, could be the basis of Awadhi.

The closest relative of Awadhi is the Bagheli language as genealogically both descend from the same 'Half-Magadhi'. Most early Indian linguists regarded Bagheli merely as 'the southern form of Awadhi', but recent studies accept Bagheli as a separate dialect at par with Awadhi and not merely a sub-dialect of it.

Phonology

Vowels 
Awadhi possesses both voiced and voiceless vowels. The voiced vowels are: /ə/, /ʌ/, /aː/, /ɪ/, /iː/, /ʊ/, /uː/, /e/, /eː/, /o/, /oː/. The voiceless vowels, also described as "whispered vowels" are: /i̥/, /ʊ̥/, /e̥/.

Vowel Combinations

Consonants

Grammar

Comparative grammar 
Awadhi has many features that separate it from the neighbouring Western Hindi and Bihari vernaculars. In Awadhi, nouns are generally both short and long, whereas Western Hindi has generally short while Bihari generally employs longer and long forms. The gender is rigorously maintained in Western Hindi, Awadhi is a little loose yet largely preserved, while Bihari is highly attenuated. Regarding postpositions, Awadhi is distinguished from Western Hindi by the absence of agentive postposition in the former, agreeing with Bihari dialects. The accusative-dative postposition in Awadhi is /kaː/ or /kə/ while Western Hindi has /koː/ or /kɔː/ and Bihari has /keː/. The locative postposition in both Bihari and Western Hindi is /mẽː/ while Awadhi has /maː/. The pronouns in Awadhi have /toːɾ-/, /moːɾ-/ as personal genitives while /teːɾ-/, /meːɾ-/ are used in Western Hindi. The oblique of /ɦəmaːɾ/ is /ɦəmɾeː/ in Awadhi while it is /ɦəmaːɾeː/ in Western Hindi and /ɦəmrən'kæ/ in Bihari.

Another defining characteristic of Awadhi is the affix /-ɪs/ as in /dɪɦɪs/, /maːɾɪs/ etc. The neighbouring Bhojpuri has the distinctive (i) /laː/ enclitic in present tense (ii) /-l/ in past tense (iii) dative postposition /-laː/ which separates it from the Awadhi language.

Pronouns 

Notes:

indicates a form inflectable for gender and number :
 mor → mōrā (masculine), mōrī (feminine), mōrē (plural)
 hamār → hamrā (masc.), hamrī (fem.), hamrē (pl.)
 tōr→ torā (masc.), torī (fem.), torē (pl.)
 tumar→ tumrā (masc.), tumrī (fem.), tumrē (pl.)
 tohār→ tohrā (masc.), tohrī (fem.), tohrē (pl.)

Word Formation 

Following are the morphological processes of stem formation in the Awadhi language:

Affixation

An affix is used to alter the meaning or form of a word. It can be either a prefix or a suffix.
 Example: Prefix bē– preceding the root saram means "shameless" while apna followed by –pan means "belonging-ness".

Compounding

Two or more stems are combined to form one stem.
 Example: nīlkanṭh means "blue bird" and banmānus means "forest man" or "chimpanzee".

Reduplication

This process involves the repetition of certain forms. It may be complete, partial, or interrupted.

 Complete reduplication: It denotes continuity of action.
 Example: jāt-jāt for "going on".
 Partial reduplication: It denotes similarity of one object to other.
 Example: hãpaṭ-dãpaṭ for "panting".
 Interrupted reduplication: It stresses on the instant condition of the action that follows and expresses abundance of something.
 Example: khētaī khēt "between the fields"; garmaī garam "the very hot".

Literature

Late-medieval and early-modern India 
In this period, Awadhi became the vehicle for epic poetry in northern India. Its literature is mainly divided into: bhaktīkāvya (devotional poetry) and premākhyān (romantic tales).

Bhaktīkāvyas
The most important work, probably in any modern Indo-Aryan language, came from the poet-saint Tulsidas in the form of Ramcharitmanas (1575 C.E.) or "The Lake of the Deeds of Rama", written in doha-chaupai metre. Its plot is mostly derivative, either from the original Rāmāyaṇa by Valmiki or from the Adhyātma Rāmāyaṇa, both of which are in Sanskrit. Mahatma Gandhi had acclaimed the Ramcharitmanas as "the greatest book of all devotional literature" while western observers have christened it as "the Bible of Northern India". It is sometimes synonymously referred as 'Tulsidas Ramayana' or simply 'the Ramayana'.

Tulsidas's compositions Hanuman Chalisa, Pārvatī Maṅgala and Jānakī Maṅgala are also written in Awadhi.

The first Hindi vernacular adaptation of the 'Dasam Skandha' of the Bhagavata Purana, the "Haricharit" by Lalachdas, who hailed from Hastigram (present-day Hathgaon near Rae Bareilly), was concluded in 1530 C.E. It circulated widely for a long time and scores of manuscript copies of the text have been found as far as eastern Uttar Pradesh and Bihar, Malwa and Gujarat, all written in the Kaithi script.

Satyavatī (ca. 1501) of Ishvaradas (of Delhi) under the reign of Sikander Lodi and Avadhabilāsa (1700 C.E.) of Laladas were also written in Awadhi.

Awadhi appeared as a major component in the works of Bhakti saints like Kabir, who used a language often described as being a pancmel khicṛī or "a hotch-potch" of several vernaculars. The language of Kabir's major work Bijak is primarily Awadhi.

Premākhyāns

Awadhi also emerged as the favourite literary language of the Eastern Sufis from the last quarter of the 14th century onwards. It became the language of premākhyāns, romantic tales built on the pattern of Persian masnavi, steeped in Sufi mysticism but set in a purely Indian background, with a large number of motifs directly borrowed from Indian lore. The first of such premākhyān in the Awadhi language was Candāyan (1379 C.E.) of Maulana Da'ud. The tradition was carried forward by Jayasi, whose masterpiece, the Padmāvat (1540 C.E.) was composed under the reign of the famous ruler Sher Shah Suri. The Padmavat travelled far and wide, from Arakan to the Deccan, and was eagerly copied and retold in Persian and other languages.

Other prominent works of Jayasi—Kānhāvat, Akhrāvaṭ and Ākhrī Kalām are also written in Awadhi.

The Awadhi romance Mirigāvatī (ca.1503) or "The Magic Doe", was written by Shaikh 'Qutban' Suhravardi, who was an expert and storyteller attached to the court-in-exile of Sultan Hussain Shah Sharqi of Jaunpur. Another romance named Madhumālatī or "Night Flowering Jasmine" by poet Sayyid Manjhan Rajgiri was written in 1545 C.E.

Amir Khusrau (d. 1379 C.E) is also said to have written some compositions in Awadhi.

Modern India 
The most significant contributions to the Awadhi literature in the modern period have come from writers like Ramai Kaka (1915-1982 C.E.), Balbhadra Prasad Dikshit better known as ‘Padhees’(1898-1943 C.E.) and Vanshidhar Shukla (1904-1980 C.E.).

‘Krishnayan’ (1942 C.E.) is a major Awadhi epic-poem that Dwarka Prasad Mishra wrote in imprisonment during the Freedom Movement of India.

Popular culture

Entertainment 
The 1961 film Gunga Jumna features Awadhi being spoken by the characters in a neutralised form. In the 2001 film Lagaan, a neutralised form of Awadhi language was used to make it understandable to audiences. The 2009 film Dev.D features an Awadhi song, "Paayaliya", composed by Amit Trivedi. In the television series Yudh, Amitabh Bachchan spoke parts of his dialogue in Awadhi, which received critical acclaim from the Hindustan Times. Awadhi is also spoken by the residents of Ayodhya and other minor characters in Ramanand Sagar's 1987 television series Ramayan. It is believed that the tune and lyrics of the song "Rang Barse Bhige Chunar Wali", from the movie Silsila starring Amitabh Bachchan and Rekha, are taken from a Rajasthani and Haryanvi folk bhajan about Meera. However the lyrics are slightly altered into the Awadhi dialect of Hindi to mould the song into appropriate context of the movie script. The Awadhi folk song "Mere Angne Mein Tumhara Kya Kaam Hai" has become popular in Bollywood with a neutralized version of it being in the 1981 film Laawaris starring Amitabh Bachchan, as well as being in the 1970 film Bombay Talkie and the 1975 film Maze Le Lo, it was also released as a single by Neha Kakkar in 2020. Another Awadhi folk song that became popular through Bollywood was "Holi Khele Raghuveera", which was neutralized and sung by Amitabh Bachchan and put into the 2003 film Baghban starring Amitabh Bachchan and Hema Malini. The hit 1994 Bollywood hit film Hum Aapke Hain Koun..! is based on an Awadhi film from 1982 Nadiya Ke Paar, which itself is partly based on the novel Kohbar Ki Shart by Keshav Prasad Mishra.

Folk 
The genres of folklore sung in Awadh include Sohar, Sariya, Byaah, Suhag, Gaari, Nakta, Banraa (Banna-Banni), Alha, Sawan, Jhula, Hori, Barahmasa, and Kajri.

Sample phrases 
The Awadhi language comes with its dialectal variations. For instance, in western regions, the auxiliary /hʌiː/ is used, while in central and eastern parts /ʌhʌiː/ is used.

The following examples were taken from Baburam Saxena's Evolution of Awadhi, and alternative versions are also provided to show dialectal variations.

See also
 Awadh
 Bagheli language
 Fijian Hindustani
 Caribbean Hindustani

Footnotes

References

Further reading

External links

 Entry for Awadhi at SIL International
 Awadhi Books

Hindi languages
Languages of India
Languages of Fiji
Languages of Uttar Pradesh
Culture of Awadh
Languages of Lumbini Province
Languages of Sudurpashchim Province